Tylicki (feminine: Tylicka; plural: Tyliccy) is a Polish surname. Notable people with the surname include:

 Frederik Tylicki (born c. 1986), German flat racing jockey
 Jacek Tylicki (born 1951), Polish artist
 Justyna Budzińska-Tylicka (1867–1936), Polish physician and feminist

See also
 

Polish-language surnames